Importin subunit alpha-6 is a protein that in humans is encoded by the KPNA5 gene.

The transport of molecules between the nucleus and the cytoplasm in eukaryotic cells is mediated by the nuclear pore complex (NPC) which consists of 60-100 proteins and is probably 120 million daltons in molecular size. Small molecules (up to 70 kD) can pass through the nuclear pore by nonselective diffusion; larger molecules are transported by an active process. Most nuclear proteins contain short basic amino acid sequences known as nuclear localization signals (NLSs). 

KPNA5 protein belongs to the importin alpha protein family and is thought to be involved in NLS-dependent protein import into the nucleus

References

Further reading

Armadillo-repeat-containing proteins